The 1990–91 Essex Senior Football League season was the 20th in the history of Essex Senior Football League a football competition in England.

League table

The league featured 14 clubs which competed in the league last season, along with one new club:
Hullbridge Sports, joined from the Essex Intermediate League

League table

References

Essex Senior Football League seasons
1990–91 in English football leagues